Nusi can refer to:
 Noussy, Guinea
 Nusi Island, also known as Tench Island, Papua New Guinea
 Nüsi mosques, Women's mosques in China

People
 Nusi Somogyi (1884–1963), Hungarian film and stage actress
 Nushi Tulliu (1872–1941), Aromanian poet and prose writer;  in Romanian